Susan Margaret Auch (born March 1, 1966) is a Canadian former speed skater who competed in five Winter Olympics, winning bronze in the 3000m relay at the 1988 Winter Olympics in Calgary, and the silver in the 500 m events at the 1994 Winter Olympics in Lillehammer, Norway and the 1998 games at Nagano, Japan. In 1999, Auch announced her retirement from competition, but changed her mind and competed in a fifth Winter Olympics, the 2002 games at Salt Lake City, but didn't reach the podium and retired after those games.

Winnipeg's long track speed skating oval is the "Susan Auch Speed Skating Oval."

She was inducted into the Manitoba Sports Hall of Fame and Museum in 2003, the Canadian Olympic Hall of Fame in 2010, and Canada's Sports Hall of Fame in 2015.

She ran as a Progressive Conservative in Winnipeg's Assiniboia constituency during the 2011 Manitoba provincial election but came in second to the New Democrat's Jim Rondeau.

See also
 Manitoba Sports Hall of Fame and Museum

References

External links
 
 Manitoba Sports Hall of Fame profile
 
 
 
 

1966 births
Speed skaters from Winnipeg
Olympic speed skaters of Canada
Olympic short track speed skaters of Canada
Canadian female short track speed skaters
Short track speed skaters at the 1988 Winter Olympics
Speed skaters at the 1992 Winter Olympics
Speed skaters at the 1994 Winter Olympics
Speed skaters at the 1998 Winter Olympics
Speed skaters at the 2002 Winter Olympics
Olympic silver medalists for Canada
Olympic bronze medalists for Canada
Living people
Olympic medalists in speed skating
Canadian female speed skaters
Medalists at the 1998 Winter Olympics
Medalists at the 1994 Winter Olympics
Medalists at the 1988 Winter Olympics
Universiade medalists in short track speed skating
Universiade silver medalists for Canada
Competitors at the 1985 Winter Universiade
20th-century Canadian women